Buraidah is the capital and largest city of Al-Qassim Region in north-central Saudi Arabia in the heart of the Arabian Peninsula. Buraydah lies equidistant from the Red Sea to the west and Persian Gulf to the east. Its known for its dates festival which is the biggest in the world with various types of dates. It has been called the city of dates. On November 8, 2021, the United Nations Educational, Scientific and Cultural Organization "UNESCO" included the city of Buraidah within the UNESCO Network of Creative Cities, in the field of gastronomy.

Buraydah, the regional capital of Al-Qassim Region, is located on the edge of the Wadi Al-Rummah.
Buraydah has a typical desert climate, with hot summers, mild winters and low humidity.

In Buraydah, agriculture is still the cornerstone of the economy. The traditional oasis products of dates, lemon, orange and other fruits are still important. Modern introduction of wheat production has become so successful that Buraydah is one of the largest producers in the kingdom, important in making Saudi Arabia a net exporter of cereal.

Notable landmarks 

 Museum of Buraydah: it is on King Abdul Aziz Road next to King Khaled Beridp civilization, and there are days devoted for families and days for young people, and it has on display the area's heritage from all different aspects of life.
 Market trades and handicrafts
 King Khalid Cultural Center and Garden: in the vicinity of the Museum, a major Buraydah gardens open to visitors every day and in meetings and places for children is innocent and is in the summer, the administration of the summer activities for families and children.
 Buraydah water tower: It is opened to visitors in the summer (festival).
 Buraidah Dates Market: It is the largest dates market in the world and is located in the center of buraidah.
 Buraidah Camel Market: The Buraidah Camel Market is the largest camel market in the world and is situated on the outskirts of Buraydah in Al-Qassim and is a spectacular sight with thousands of camels for sale.

Roads and transport 

Highways link Buraydah to the major cities surrounding it. It is 317 kilometers by highway to get to Riyadh, 450 km to get to Medina, and 250 kilometers to get to Ha'il. One can travel up to the border of Jordan, in a dual network of roads. There is now a railway line starting from Riyadh to Qurayyat operated by SAR with a modern rail station located at the northeast of the city. There is a train station in Buraidah with direct trains to Riyadh, Majmaa and Hail and from their to Jouf as well.

The Prince Nayef bin Abdulaziz International Airport West of buraidah was built in 1964 and was expanded in 1964 over an area of 55,000 km2 with a capacity of 550,000 passengers. In 2009, international flights were launched. Flights to Dubai, Istanbul, Manamah, Kuwait and Cairo are scheduled regularly along with domestic destinations.

Climate 
Buraidah has a hot desert climate (Köppen climate classification BWh), with long, extremely hot summers and short, very mild winters. Precipitation is very low, which falls almost entirely between November and May, leaving summers extremely dry.

Population 
The city has experienced very high rates of population growth. Buraidah officially counted population in the city limits in 2010 was 614,093.

Education

Public schools
General Administration of Education in Qassim region enrolls over 118,589 students in primary, intermediate and high public schools in Buraidah. These students are enrolled in 381 primary schools, 211 intermediate schools and 131 public high schools. 9754 students are enrolled in 77 private schools. There are number of international schools in Buraidah as well as many private kindergartens.

Colleges and universities
Qassim University is the largest higher educational institution in Al-Qassim region located in the west of Buraidah where more than 70,000 undergraduate and graduate students attend 38 colleges. Qassim University is among  Saudi Arabia's largest 29 public Universities in terms of number of students. Besides Qassim University, There are three private higher education establishments in Buraidah. Mustaqbal University is a private university where 1234 undergraduate students study in engineering, computer science, dentistry, and administrative and human sciences colleges. Buraydah Colleges is another private higher education establishment where 2987 undergraduate students are enrolled in four faculties focused in dentistry, applied medical science, engineering and information technology, and administrative and human sciences colleges. The third private higher education institute is Al-Ghad International Health Sciences Colleges.

Vocational training colleges
In addition to the technical training high school, there are Buraidah College of Technology and the College of Food and Environment Technology which are two technical colleges managed by TVTC. Also, there are the International Technical Colleges operated in cooperation between TVTC and Laureate Vocational Saudi Arabia. Saudi Railway Polytechnic is a unique vocational training institute for railway technology located in the city.

Libraries
Besides Qassim University central libraries that hold more than 2,200,000 items, King Saud public library is the main public library in Buraidah with around 30,000 titles and it is the oldest government public library in Saudi Arabia. Sulaiman Al Rajhi Public library and the Literary club library are two other libraries open to the public in the city.

See also
 Qassim University
 Buraidah College of Technology
 List of cities and towns in Saudi Arabia

Notes

Further reading
 Mackey, Sandra. The Saudis: Inside the Desert Kingdom. Updated Edition. Norton Paperback. W.W. Norton and Company, New York. 2002 (first edition: 1987). 

 
Populated places in Al-Qassim Province
Provincial capitals of Saudi Arabia